This is a list of the top 50 singles in 2009 in New Zealand, as listed by the Recording Industry Association of New Zealand (RIANZ).

Chart
Smashproof's "Brother" was the longest-running song in 2009, peaked at number one in eleven weeks in a row. The Black Eyed Peas's "I Gotta Feeling" and Keri Hilson's "Knock You Down" behind "Brother" for longest-running at number one, with 9 weeks and 6 weeks. Beyoncé's "Halo" was the longest-running in the chart this year, spent 33 weeks inside the chart. Black Eyed Peas' "I Gotta Feeling" and Smashproof's "Brother" tied in the second place, with 29 weeks and Taylor Swift's "Love Story" in the third place with 27 weeks.

Keyp
 – Song of New Zealand origin

Top 20 singles of 2009 by New Zealand artists 

*Numbers 14 to 20 are currently unavailable

Notes

References
 The Official NZ Music Chart, RIANZ website

2009 in New Zealand music
2009 record charts
Singles 2009